James Keck may refer to:

 James C. Keck (1924–2010), American physicist and engineer
 James M. Keck (1921–2018), U.S. Air Force general